Vaptistis ( "Baptist") is a village and a community in the municipality of Kilkis, Kilkis regional unit of Greece. In 2011 its population was 330 for the village, and 344 for the community, which includes the village Kyriakaiika. It is situated 9 km west of Kilkis, 17 km east of Polykastro and 42 km north of Thessaloniki. The village has a primary school, a high school, a stadium and three churches. The protector saint is St. John the Baptist, and the village is named after him. There are an athletic club "A.C. Doxa Vaptisti" and a cultural one "Politistikos Syllogos Vaptisti".

Name
During the Ottoman period, the village was known as Haydarlı.

Population
Before 1922, the village was inhabited by Turks and its name was Haydarlı (Aydarlı). Following the population exchange between Greece and Turkey, Greeks from Eastern Thrace moved into Haydarlı. Turks followed the same route but towards the opposite direction.

References

Populated places in Kilkis (regional unit)